The brown-capped babbler (Pellorneum fuscocapillus) is a member of the family Pellorneidae.

Distribution
The brown-capped babbler is an endemic resident breeding bird in Sri Lanka. Its habitat is forest undergrowth and thick scrub. This species, like most babblers, is not migratory, and has short rounded wings and a weak flight.

Ecology
This babbler builds its nest on the ground or in a hole, concealed in dense masses of foliage. The normal clutch is two or three eggs.

Description

The brown-capped babbler is a smallish to medium-sized babbler, at  including its long tail. It is brown above and rich cinnamon below. It has a dark brown crown.

Brown-capped babblers have short dark bills. Their food is mainly insects. They can be difficult to observe in the dense vegetation they prefer, but like other babblers, these are noisy birds, and their characteristic calls are often the best indication that these birds are present.

Behavior
Brown-capped babblers are usually believed to occur in pairs. Male birds make a distinctive call ("pretty dear") to attract other birds. Breeding season occurs during the first half of the year, during which time males exhibit territorial behavior.

In culture

In Sri Lanka, this bird is known as parandel-kurulla (translates to 'dried-grass(colored) bird') or redi diang (onomatopoeic in origin) in Sinhala language. Brown-capped babbler appears in a 4 rupee Sri Lankan postal stamp,

Subspecies
Three subspecies found.
P. f. babaulti (T. Wells, 1919) - low country dry zone
P. f. fuscocapillus (Blyth, 1849) - hill country
P. f. scotillum (Blyth, 1849) - low country wet zone

References

 Birds of India by Grimmett, Inskipp and Inskipp, 
 A Field Guide to the Birds of the Indian Subcontinent by Kazmierczak and van Perlo, 
Collar, N. J. & Robson, C. 2007. Family Timaliidae (Babblers)  pp. 70 – 291 in; del Hoyo, J., Elliott, A. & Christie, D.A. eds. Handbook of the Birds of the World, Vol. 12. Picathartes to Tits and Chickadees. Lynx Edicions, Barcelona.

brown-capped babbler
Endemic birds of Sri Lanka
brown-capped babbler
brown-capped babbler